SemaConnect is an electric vehicle infrastructure company located in Bowie, Maryland founded in 2008 by entrepreneur, Mahi Reddy. The company and its assets were acquired by Blink Charging in June 2022.

Company
SemaConnect is a developer and producer of smart networked Electric Vehicle charging stations and electric vehicle software for station owners and EV drivers. The company launched in 2008 with the first ChargePro 620 edition and EV software called SemaCharge.

SemaConnect has 150 ChargePro charging stations in Maryland, Virginia and Washington, D.C. In 2011, SemaConnect partnered with 350Green for the launch of 1,500 charging stations across the U.S. at retailers including Walgreens and Simon Properties. In July 2015, SemaConnect raised $15 million to expand their electric car network and customer support services.

ChargePro
The ChargePro charging station uses the North American standard SAEJ1772 connector for Level 2 charging. The ChargePro charging station is designed for installation in commercial properties including municipal, parking, multifamily, hotel, office and retail locations. The ChargePro can have a single or double head unit, and can come with or without a cable management system.

Partnerships
 SemaConnect uses MobileNOW to permit EV Charging payment by cell phone with the Charge Pro.
 SemaConnect uses PlugShare (under company Recargo) technology to offer public charger payment options.

Acquisition by Blink Charging
In June 2022 it was announced that Miami, FL based EV charging network Blink Charging would be acquiring SemaConnect in a $200 million stock and cash deal. SemaConnect’s founder and CEO, Mahi Reddy, is to join Blink’s board of directors.

See also
 Plug-in vehicle
 Plug-in hybrid vehicle
 Electric vehicle
 Electric vehicle infrastructure
 Charging station

References

External links 
Official website

Electric vehicle infrastructure developers
Companies based in Maryland
Electric vehicle industry